Osmia alaiensis is a species of bee in the family Megachilidae. It was described by Van der Zanden in 1994.

References

alaiensis
Insects described in 1994